Agricol Moureau (born 1766, Avignon - died 1842, Aix-en-Provence) was a figure in the French Revolution. Defrocked as a priest, he became a Jacobin, edited the Courrier d'Avignon, set up the département of Vaucluse, acted as the French Directory's administrator of Vaucluse, became a member of the Council of Five Hundred and finally was made a commissioner of the Directory to Paris. He was nicknamed "the Sans-culotte of Le Midi".

See also
France in the long nineteenth century

1766 births
1842 deaths
People of the French Revolution
Clergy from Avignon
Politicians from Avignon